St Albans Girls' School, usually referred to as STAGS, is a girls secondary school in St Albans, Hertfordshire. It was formerly known as "St Albans Girls' Grammar School."

It is one of three all-girls schools in St Albans, the others being Loreto College and St Albans High School for Girls; the latter is private and selective. The school has specialisms in Business and Enterprise and Applied Learning. There are approximately 1,300 students, including boys, on roll at the school (2010 figures). The current Headteacher is Mrs Margaret Chapman.  Mr Howard Bracegirdle has been Site

Achievements and recognition
 Number of students achieving 5 GCSE grades A*-C is usually between 85-90%.
 The School was awarded the School Achievement Award by DfES in 2002.

House system
The school has eight houses, all named after famous women: Austen, Bronte, Curie, Franklin, Hepworth, Johnson, Parks and Seacole.  The assigned colour of the house that a student belongs to is displayed as a small stag on their blouse collar. Parks is a new house that was made for the start of the 2019 academic year, after the school had finished its £2.5 million expansion that took a year to complete.
The colours are as follows:
Austen - Red
Bronte - Yellow
Curie - Green
Franklin - Orange
Hepworth - Blue
Johnson - Silver
Parks - Pink
Seacole - Purple
Each house has a head of house (staff) and either one or two house captains elected from the Lower 6th. The house system encourages a positive competitive nature in sports and competitions. There are a number of big events covered by the house system every year. The Christmas Fair includes stalls from each house competing for three awards: 'Best Stall', 'Best Display' and 'Best over all contribution to the Fair'. There is also an inter-house Easter event which has a different theme every year. In 2011 it was 'One, Two, Glee....Go!', an event where each house had to present a piece by a specific artist. There is also a themed 'House Challenge Day' every year, where each house has various tasks to fulfill to make up a final score. The winning house gets a large number of house points to add to their total.

The previous house system had seven houses, all named after planets: Krypton (the home planet of superman), Mars, Mercury, Jupiter, Neptune, Saturn and Pluto.

Uniform
The uniform consists of a navy blue blazer with badge, a navy, knee-length skirt or navy trousers, a navy jumper with school trim and blue badge with embroidered STAGs in house colours. The Sixth form may wear more formal, work-style clothes, which include a smart skirt of reasonable length or smart full-length trousers and a blouse or top with sleeves. Boys should wear a formal shirt and trousers. On formal occasions when representing the school, all sixth formers must wear a black tailored jacket with white shirt (and tie for the boys), black trousers or skirt.

Notable former pupils
Olivia Allison, Olympic synchronized swimmer.
Anouk Denton, footballer
Maddy Prior of the electric folk band Steeleye Span.
Jeany Spark, actress.

References

Academies in Hertfordshire
Girls' schools in Hertfordshire
Educational institutions established in 1920
1920 establishments in England
Schools in St Albans
Secondary schools in Hertfordshire